Nepenthes mindanaoensis ("from Mindanao") is a tropical pitcher plant native to the Philippine islands of Mindanao and Dinagat.

Nepenthes mindanaoensis belongs to the informal "N. alata group", which also includes N. alata, N. ceciliae, N. copelandii, N. extincta, N. graciliflora, N. hamiguitanensis, N. kitanglad, N. kurata, N. leyte, N. negros, N. ramos, N. saranganiensis, and N. ultra. These species are united by a number of morphological characters, including winged petioles, lids with basal ridges on the lower surface (often elaborated into appendages), and upper pitchers that are usually broadest near the base.

Nepenthes alata var. ecristata—described by John Muirhead Macfarlane in his 1908 monograph, "Nepenthaceae"—was briefly considered a synonym of N. mindanaoensis, then regarded as a species in its own right (N. kurata), before that species was synonymised with N. ramos.

Natural hybrids
N. alata × N. mindanaoensis
N. bellii × N. mindanaoensis
N. merrilliana × N. mindanaoensis
N. mindanaoensis × N. truncata
N. mindananoensis × N. erucoides 

Certain plants from Mount Hamiguitan may represent crosses between N. justinae (previously identified as N. mindanaoensis) and N. hamiguitanensis, N. micramphora, and N. peltata.

References

Further reading

 Bonhomme, V., H. Pelloux-Prayer, E. Jousselin, Y. Forterre, J.-J. Labat & L. Gaume 2011. Slippery or sticky? Functional diversity in the trapping strategy of Nepenthes carnivorous plants. New Phytologist 191(2): 545–554. 
 Co, L. & W. Suarez 2012. Nepenthaceae. Co's Digital Flora of the Philippines.
  Gronemeyer, T. 2008. Nepenthes auf den Philippinen – Ein Reisebericht. Das Taublatt 60(1): 15–27.
  McPherson, S. & T. Gronemeyer 2008. Die Nepenthesarten der Philippinen Eine Fotodokumentation. Das Taublatt 60(1): 34–78.

Carnivorous plants of Asia
mindanaoensis
Endemic flora of the Philippines
Flora of Mindanao
Threatened flora of Asia
Plants described in 2001